LACP may stand for:

 League of American Communications Professionals, an organization encouraging quality in communications
 Link Aggregation Control Protocol, an Ethernet protocol that allows the bundling of several ports
 Los Angeles County Police
 Lateral Assessment & Certification Program (LACP), a standardized coding protocol used by pipe inspectors when surveying lateral connections